Craig Marsh is a Welsh pool player who plays on the IPA tour.

Marsh was the IPA 2014 European Professional Champion.

Titles
 2017 IPA World Blackball Championship
 2014 European Professional Championship

References

Welsh pool players
Living people
Welsh sportspeople
Place of birth missing (living people)
Year of birth missing (living people)